Dysauxes parvigutta is a moth of the family Erebidae. It was described by Hugo Theodor Christoph in 1889. It is found in Iran.

Subspecies
Dysauxes parvigutta parvigutta
Dysauxes parvigutta guttulifera Ignatyev & Zolotuhin, 2006 (northern Iran)

References

 Arctiidae genus list. Butterflies and Moths of the World. Natural History Museum, London.

Syntomini
Moths described in 1889